The Libya–Tunisia border is 461 km (286 mi) in length and runs from the Mediterranean Sea in the north to the tripoint with Algeria in the south.

Description
The border starts in the north on the Mediterranean coast at Ras Ajdir, proceeding overland southwards and then south-westwards via a series of irregular lines down to the tripoint with Algeria.

History
For most of the 19th century both Tunisia and the coastal regions of modern Libya (organised as the Vilayet of Tripolitania were part of the Ottoman Empire, though with a large degree of de facto autonomy. France occupied Tunisia in 1881 and created a protectorate. France and the Ottomans established a border on the coast between Tunisia and Tripolitania in 1886, which was then extended southwards down to the vicinity of Ghadames in 1892. A treaty of 19 May 1910 then delimited the border in greater detail and was then demarcated on the ground with pillars in 1910–11.

In September 1911 Italy invaded Tripolitania, and the Treaty of Ouchy was signed the following year by which the Ottomans formally ceded sovereignty of the area over to Italy. Italy organised the newly conquered regions into the colonies of Italian Cyrenaica and Italian Tripolitania and gradually began pushing further south; in 1934 they united the two territories as Italian Libya.

During the North African Campaign of the Second World War Italy was defeated and its African colonies were occupied by the Allied powers, with Libya split into British and French zones of occupation. Libya was later granted full independence on 2 December 1951. France granted Tunisia independence in 1956, and the border then became one between two sovereign states.

In 2011 Libyan dictator Muammar Gaddafi was overthrown in a short civil war, which occasionally spilled over into Tunisian territory, as well as resulting in thousands of refugees crossing the border. The border remains insecure owing to the ongoing civil war in Libya.

Settlements near the border

Libya
 El Assa
 Wazzin

Tunisia
 Alouet el Gouna
 Dehiba

See also
 Libya–Tunisia relations

References

 
Borders of Libya
Borders of Tunisia
International borders